Maungaturoto is a small town in the Northland Region of New Zealand. 

The township is located close to the Otamatea River, an estuarial arm of the Kaipara Harbour 25 kilometres north of Wellsford and 45 kilometres south of Whangārei.

Demographics
Maungaturoto is part of the larger Maungaturoto statistical area.

Maungaturoto settlement had a population of 912 at the 2018 New Zealand census, an increase of 123 people (15.6%) since the 2013 census, and an increase of 51 people (5.9%) since the 2006 census. There were 318 households, comprising 450 males and 468 females, giving a sex ratio of 0.96 males per female, with 204 people (22.4%) aged under 15 years, 186 (20.4%) aged 15 to 29, 360 (39.5%) aged 30 to 64, and 171 (18.8%) aged 65 or older.

Ethnicities were 84.9% European/Pākehā, 24.7% Māori, 2.3% Pacific peoples, 2.6% Asian, and 0.7% other ethnicities. People may identify with more than one ethnicity.

Although some people chose not to answer the census's question about religious affiliation, 41.8% had no religion, 43.1% were Christian, 3.6% had Māori religious beliefs, 0.7% were Hindu, 0.3% were Muslim, 0.3% were Buddhist and 1.0% had other religions.

Of those at least 15 years old, 63 (8.9%) people had a bachelor's or higher degree, and 171 (24.2%) people had no formal qualifications. 96 people (13.6%) earned over $70,000 compared to 17.2% nationally. The employment status of those at least 15 was that 306 (43.2%) people were employed full-time, 108 (15.3%) were part-time, and 27 (3.8%) were unemployed.

Maungaturoto statistical area

Maungaturoto had a population of 1,269 at the 2018 New Zealand census, an increase of 180 people (16.5%) since the 2013 census, and an increase of 156 people (14.0%) since the 2006 census. There were 450 households, comprising 639 males and 630 females, giving a sex ratio of 1.01 males per female. The median age was 37.1 years (compared with 37.4 years nationally), with 291 people (22.9%) aged under 15 years, 234 (18.4%) aged 15 to 29, 510 (40.2%) aged 30 to 64, and 231 (18.2%) aged 65 or older.

Ethnicities were 85.8% European/Pākehā, 23.4% Māori, 2.8% Pacific peoples, 2.4% Asian, and 0.9% other ethnicities. People may identify with more than one ethnicity.

The percentage of people born overseas was 12.3, compared with 27.1% nationally.

Although some people chose not to answer the census's question about religious affiliation, 43.0% had no religion, 42.1% were Christian, 2.8% had Māori religious beliefs, 0.7% were Hindu, 0.2% were Muslim, 0.2% were Buddhist and 1.2% had other religions.

Of those at least 15 years old, 87 (8.9%) people had a bachelor's or higher degree, and 222 (22.7%) people had no formal qualifications. The median income was $24,100, compared with $31,800 nationally. 147 people (15.0%) earned over $70,000 compared to 17.2% nationally. The employment status of those at least 15 was that 438 (44.8%) people were employed full-time, 147 (15.0%) were part-time, and 30 (3.1%) were unemployed.

Education
Otamatea High School is a secondary (years 7–13) school with a roll of  students.  The school held its 50th reunion in 2016. The District High School was established in Maungaturoto in 1939. Otamatea High School won the Goodman Fielder Composite School of the Year Award in 2000.

Maungaturoto School is a contributing primary (years 1–6) school with a roll of  students. A school first opened in Maungaturoto in 1874.

Otamatea Christian School is a composite state-integrated (years 1–13) school with a roll of  students.

All these schools are coeducational. Rolls are as of

Railway station 

Passenger trains ended on 31 July 1967. Refreshment rooms opened in 1923, and had a hostel built for female refreshment room staff in 1940, but closed in November 1956. An engine shed was moved from Wellsford in 1920. Maungaturoto station also had a   x  goods shed, loading bank, cattle yards and a passing loop for 52 wagons.

Notes

External links
Maungaturoto's Official website

Populated places in the Northland Region
Kaipara District
Populated places around the Kaipara Harbour